This is a list of members of Parliament elected to the Parliament of the United Kingdom at the 1964 general election, held on 15 October 1964.

Notable newcomers to the House of Commons included Geoffrey Howe, Roy Hattersley, Shirley Williams, Peter Shore, Robert Maxwell, Brian Walden, Alan Williams, Anthony Meyer, Alf Morris, George Younger and Bernard Weatherill.

By nation 

 List of MPs for constituencies in Scotland (1964–1966)

Composition
These representative diagrams show the composition of the parties in the 1964 general election.

Note: This is not the official seating plan of the House of Commons, which has five rows of benches on each side, with the government party to the right of the Speaker and opposition parties to the left, but with room for only around two-thirds of MPs to sit at any one time.

(The Conservatives formed an electoral alliance with the Unionists and National Liberal. The figure shown, is the combined total of all three.)



By-elections
See the list of United Kingdom by-elections.

See also
List of parliaments of the United Kingdom
UK general election, 1964
:Category:UK MPs 1964-1966

1964
1964 United Kingdom general election
 List
UK MPs